The list of shipwrecks in June 1832 includes ships sunk, foundered, grounded, or otherwise lost during June 1832.

2 June

3 June

5 June

9 June

11 June

21 June

22 June

24 June

28 June

30 June

Unknown date

References

1832-06